Danny Munyao (born 2 November 1987) is Zambian football goalkeeper currently playing for Red Arrows F.C. in the Zambian Premier League.

Club career
His football career began at Red Arrows F.C. in 2007. He appeared for them in the Zambian Premier League and also won the Zambian Cup. In 2010, he made a move to Zanaco F.C. before returning to Red Arrows in 2011.

International career
Munyao's first call-up to the Zambian team was to the 2013 Africa Cup of Nations roster. He has since appeared in nine international matches for Zambia, including in 2014 FIFA World Cup qualification and 2015 Africa Cup of Nations qualification.

References

External links
 Goal.com Profile

1987 births
Living people
Zambian footballers
Zambia international footballers
Association football goalkeepers
2013 Africa Cup of Nations players
2015 Africa Cup of Nations players
Zanaco F.C. players
Red Arrows F.C. players